Moslem Uddin Khan (1930 – 21 November 2013) was a Bangladesh Awami League politician and a former Jatiya Sangsad member representing the Dhaka-2 constituency.

Career
Khan was elected to parliament from Dhaka-2 as a Bangladesh Awami League candidate in 1973.

References

1930 births
2013 deaths
People from Manikganj District
Awami League politicians
1st Jatiya Sangsad members
Bangladesh Krishak Sramik Awami League central committee members